The forest thicket rat (Grammomys dryas) is a species of rodent in the family Muridae.
It is found in Burundi, Democratic Republic of the Congo, and Uganda.
Its natural habitat is subtropical or tropical moist montane forests.

References

Sources

Grammomys
Rodents of Africa
Mammals described in 1907
Taxa named by Oldfield Thomas
Taxonomy articles created by Polbot